NBC White Paper is a documentary television series on the NBC television network lasting from 1960 to 1989. Producer Arthur Zegart was nominated for an Emmy Award for the series in 1962.

References

External links
 
 Museum of Broadcast Communications

NBC original programming
1960s American documentary television series
1970s American documentary television series
1980s American documentary television series
1960 American television series debuts
1989 American television series endings
Cultural depictions of Jawaharlal Nehru